Nasrollah Moein, more commonly known as Moein, is an Iranian singer. Moein was born in Najafabad, a city in Isfahan Province of Iran.

He began his artistic caree as a radio singer and released several albums before Miparastam in 1983, which was his first album to be widely noticed in Iran. The name of this album was Ghazal. In recent years, Moein has become widely acclaimed in Iran and he has played concerts all around the globe. He is referred to as "Javdan Sedaye Eshgh," which translates to "The Eternal Voice of Love". He has two daughters, Paricheh and Setareh.

Discography

Studio albums

 Miparastam (1983)
 Arezo (1984)
 Havas (1985)
 Kabeh (1986)
 Golhaye Ghorbat (With Hayedeh) (1987)
 Safar (1987)
 Bi Bi Gol (1988)
 Sobhet Bekheir Azizam (1989)
 Isfahan (With Faezeh) (1990)
 Be To Miandisham (1991)
 Namaz (1992)
 Khatereh 7 (With Shohreh) (1992)
 Tavalod-e Eshgh (1994)
 Mosafer (1994)
 Panjereh (1997)
 Moama (1998)
 Parvaz (2000)
 Lahzeha (2002)
 Tolou (2007)
 Maandegar (2020)

Singles
 "Khatereha" (2010)
 "Hamdam" (2011)
 "Bachehaye Alborz" (Khoone Siavash) (2011)
 "Delam Tangete" (2012)
 "Majnoon" (2012)
 "Mardom" (2012)
 "Gole Naz Darom" (2013)
 "Parandeh" (featuring Siavash Ghomayshi) (2013)
 "Aghoosh" (2013)
 "Tarkam Nakon" (2013)
 "Havaye khooneh" (2014)
 "Be To Madyoonam" (2014)
 "To Ke Tamoome Donyami" (2014)
 "Shomal" (2015)
 "Atashe Del" (2015)
 "Ashegh Ke Beshi" (2015)
 "Bi To Nemitoonam" (2016)
 "Che Sali Beshe Emsal" (2016)
 "Kenare To" (2017)
 "Jane Man" (2017)
"Delam Tangete" (Live Version) (2017)
 "Divoonegi Nakon" (2017)
 "Sange Khara" (2018)
 "Shoghe Safar" (2018)
 "Khoone Arezoo" (2018)
 "Haminjoori Nemimoone" (2019)
 "Ba Man Bemoon" (2019)
 "Be Didane Man Bia" (Live Version) (2019)
 "Ka'abeh" (Live Version) (2019)
"Divaneh Miraghsad" (2021)
"Elaheye Naaz" (Unplugged Version) (2021)
"Hamdam" (Unplugged Version) (2021)
"Faghat To" (2022)
"Havas" (Live Version) (2022)
"Adamiat" (2023)

References

External links

 

1951 births
Living people
Iranian composers
Iranian songwriters
Iranian pop singers
Iranian male singers
Iranian folk singers
People from Najafabad
Caltex Records artists
Taraneh Records artists
Persian-language singers
Iranian singer-songwriters
21st-century Iranian male singers
20th-century Iranian male singers
Iranian expatriates in the United States